The 1932 Giro di Lombardia was the 28th edition of the Giro di Lombardia cycle race and was held on 23 October 1932. The race started and finished in Milan. The race was won by Antonio Negrini.

General classification

References

1932
Giro di Lombardia
Giro di Lombardia